Genertellife is an Italian insurance company based in Mogliano Veneto, Italy. It is the extension of the non-life insurance provider Genertel.
Part of the Generali Group since its foundation, from 2013 Genertellife has been headed by Generali Italia.

History
In June 2009, Generali Italia launched Genertellife, the first online life insurance company in Italy. As an extension of the non-life insurance provider Genertel, Genertellife launched with a 750,000 customer base potential.

The CEO was Davide Passero, who remained in office until 2014. 

The company is active in the life insurance sector. Genertellife is controlled by Generali Italia with a stake of around 100%

In 2012, Fata Vita S.p.A. is merged by incorporation into Genertellife.
In 2014 there is a change at the top, Passero leaves the management of the company to Manlio Lostuzzi. 

In 2018, Genertellife launched iLove, a life insurance that works with a mobile application and regular free check-ups to readjust life insurance plans on a regular basis.

In 2019, Genertellife was authorized by IVASS (Institute for the Supervision of Insurance) to operate also in the credit sector, where the company aims at the sector of the salary- or pension-backed loans.

On 1 September 2019 Maurizio Pescarini became CEO.

In 2020, to counter the emergency linked to the Covid 19 pandemic, Genertellife launches "Genertel Everywhere" a completely remote contact center available 24 hours a day.

References

External links

Financial services companies established in 2009
Italian companies established in 2009
Insurance companies of Italy
Generali Italia